Čeh is a surname meaning "Czech" in Slovene and Serbo-Croatian. Notable people with the surname include:

 Aleš Čeh (born 1968), Slovenian footballer
 Aleš Čeh (footballer, born 1980), Slovenian footballer
 Kristjan Čeh (born 1999), Slovenian discus thrower
 Nastja Čeh (born 1978), Slovenian footballer
 Sandi Čeh (born 6 April 1983), Slovenian footballer
 Tim Čeh (born 1994), Slovenian footballer

See also
 

Slovene-language surnames